The Stinger may refer to:

 The Stinger (newspaper), a student newspaper at University of Wisconsin–Superior
 The Stinger (album), a 1965 album by Johnny "Hammond" Smith

See also
 Stinger (disambiguation)